Lee Jye (born 6 June 1940) is a former defense minister of the Republic of China.

Biography
He was born in Tianjin on 6 June 1940, and fled to Taiwan with family at the end of the Chinese Civil War.

He originally joined the then ruling Kuomintang in the early days of his military career, but was later expelled by the KMT, who lost power after the 2000 presidential election, for complying with President Chen Shui-bian's orders to remove all Chiang Kai-shek statues from military bases. He was quoted saying "I'll obey the order of the party that is in power" and "if KMT holds power again, they can re-install the statues if they wish."

He was the minister of the Ministry of National Defense of the Republic of China, and was a Senior Admiral in the Republic of China Navy when he retired.

References

1940 births
Living people
Republic of China politicians from Tianjin
Kuomintang politicians in Taiwan
Taiwanese Ministers of National Defense
Recipients of the Order of Brilliant Star
Expelled members of the Kuomintang
Chinese Civil War refugees
Taiwanese people from Tianjin
Republic of China Navy admirals